Fabián Alfredo Cerda Valdés (born February 7, 1989),  is a Chilean football goalkeeper. He currently plays for Curicó Unido in the Primera División de Chile.

International career
Along with Chile U18 he won the 2008 João Havelange Tournament. The next year, he was part of the Chile U20 squad at the 2009 South American U-20 Championship.

Personal ife
His nephew, Axel Cerda, is a young player of Universidad Católica who won the 2022 Chilean Youth Championship at aunder-16 level along with the team.

Honours

Club
Universidad Católica
 Primera División de Chile (1): 2010
 Copa Chile (1): 2011

International
Chile U18
 João Havelange Tournament (1): 2008

References

External links
 
 
 
 

1989 births
Living people
People from Santiago
Chilean footballers
Chile youth international footballers
Chile under-20 international footballers
Club Deportivo Universidad Católica footballers
Cobresal footballers
Trasandino footballers
FC Tulsa players
Club Deportivo Palestino footballers
Curicó Unido footballers
Chilean Primera División players
Segunda División Profesional de Chile players
USL Championship players
Chilean expatriate footballers
Expatriate soccer players in the United States
Chilean expatriate sportspeople in the United States
Association football goalkeepers
Footballers from Santiago